Persepolis  TV was an encrypted free-to-air channel, operated by Persepolis F.C. specialising in the Iranian football team. The channel was available in Persian.

The channel was closed in 2013, however it re-opened in 2017 under the name Persepolis TV.

References

Persepolis F.C.
Television channels and stations established in 2013
Sports television networks
Persian-language television stations